Sathaar (25 May 1948 – 17 September 2019) was an Indian actor who primarily worked in Malayalam films. He made his acting debut with M. Krishnan Nair's Bharyaye Avashyamundu (1975). He became a hero in 1976, with Anaavaranam, directed by A. Vincent. Even though he started as a leading man, later he became a successful villain as well as a character actor. He also had important roles in the early 80's Tamil films Mayil and Soundaryame Varuga Varuga. He acted in almost 300 movies including Tamil and Telugu.

He was in the industry for more than 45 years and made a comeback after a brief hiatus with 22 Female Kottayam.

He died on September 17, 2019 at Aluva.

Family
He was the ninth child among ten children born to Khadarpillai and Fathima at Kadungalloor, Aluva, Ernakulam. His father was a landlord and his mother was a housewife. He had seven brothers, Abdu Kunjhu, Abdhulla, Kunju Mohammad, Kochumakkar, Veeravunny, V. K. Karim, Abdul Jaleel and two sisters, Khadeeja and Jameela. He had his primary education from Government High School West Kadungalloor Aluva and went on to pursue an M.A. in History from Union Christian College, Aluva.

During the filming of K. Narayanan's film Beena, the love affair of Sathar and Jayabharathi who was three months senior in age began and they got married in 1979. The couple parted ways in 1987. However, they continued to maintain a cordial relationship until Sathaar's death. Jayabharathi has nursed him during his last days. The couple's only son Krish J. Sathaar made his debut as an actor in acclaimed director Siddique' s Mohanlal-starrer Ladies and Gentleman. Even though Jayabharathi was away for years, he never married again. In many reports, Sathar and Jayabharathi were divorced, but they were not divorced.

Death
Sathar died at 4:30 AM on 17 September 2019 at a private hospital (CA hospital, Aluva). He had been undergoing treatment for a liver problem for three months at a private hospital in Aluva. He was 71. The funeral was held at West Kadungalloor Juma Masjid.

Filmography

Television
Valayalam (DD Malayalam)
Crime And Punishment (Asianet)
Swantham Malootty (Asianet)
Lipstick (Asianet)

Produced films
 Black Mail (1985)
 Revenge (1985)
 Kambolam(1994)

References

External links 

 
 Sathar at MSI

1952 births
2019 deaths
20th-century Indian male actors
Male actors from Kerala
Male actors in Malayalam cinema
Indian male film actors
People from Aluva
21st-century Indian male actors